is a 1999 Japanese video game released for the PlayStation. It was developed by Symbio Systems and published by Enix. The game was directed by Jun Matsumoto, while manga artist Mine Yoshizaki provided character designs.

The game is a tank combat game, featuring one on one battles between tanks. The game has never been released outside of Japan. The game received mixed reviews with most giving it mediocre scores.

Story 
A despot named Talin has lost his newly developed tank called Petit tank, which the player is now in possession of. He mobilizes his empire to retrieve the tank.

Gameplay 

The game is a one vs. one shooting action game, pitting tanks in a 3D environment.

The game features two gameplay modes: Story and Tank World. Tank World is direct battles against either a human or computer-controlled opponent.

The player starts with 8 tanks to choose from. The game features strong customization of the player's tank. There are 160 canon parts, 30 special attack parts, and 70 accessory parts. In total, over 300 parts are available. Changes to the player's tank cannon are reflected in the game's graphics. Completely custom tanks can be created, saved to the PlayStation's memory card, and even pitted against another player's custom tank as well. The game's arsenal includes both long range and short range weaponry.

The game features a camera system that automatically locks onto the opponent, and when the player is behind obstacles they become transparent.

Development and release 
The game was developed by Japanese game developer Symbio Systems. The game was directed by Jun Matsumoto, and it has character designs by manga artist Mine Yoshizaki. The game's story is told through long anime videos, as well as having an art design that is anime inspired and chibi (super deformed). The game was shown at the 1998 Autumn Tokyo Game Show.

Each tank has approximately 450 polygons to render, and the game's engine attempts to realistically replicate elements of tanks including tread physics, suspension, and engine exhaust. The tank's suspension even bends when making turns.

The game was released on July 29, 1999 for the PlayStation in Japan and was published by Enix. An official strategy guide was released as well. The game has never been released outside of Japan, and has never been released for the PlayStation Network.

Reception 

Upon the game's release, four reviewers for Weekly Famitsu gave the game scores of 7, 6, 7, and 6 for a total of 26 out of 40.

Gamers' Republic gave the game a B, saying the game was well deserving of an American localization. They praised the game's controls, physics, and camera, and said the game is fun to play in either single player or multiplayer modes. The review went onto say that the tanks had as much personality as their pilots, and had more "vigor" than those found in the game Tiny Tank. The reviewer wondered if the anime cinemas in the game implied it might be turned into an anime series, and hoped that the game would get a sequel on the PlayStation 2. Gamers' Republic later listed Pop'n Tanks! in their 1999 Video Game Buyers Guide and Y2K Preview  as one of the best games to import from Japan that year along with The Adventures of Little Ralph, Bangai-O, Neon Genesis Evangelion, Pepsiman, Robot Dandy, Metal Slug 2, Internal Section, and Mobile Suit Gundam: Char's Counter Attack.

Spanish magazine Loading praised the game. Extreme PlayStation gave it a lower score and were not impressed with it.

Notes

References 

1999 in video gaming
Japan-exclusive video games
PlayStation (console) games
PlayStation (console)-only games
Vehicular combat games
Video games developed in Japan